Forno di Zoldo was a comune (municipality) in the Province of Belluno in the Italian region Veneto, located about  north of Venice and about  north of Belluno. It has been a frazione of Val di Zoldo since 2016.

Demographic evolution

References

Cities and towns in Veneto